(lit. "Art History") is a biannual academic journal of art history, with a particular focus upon Japanese art. It is published in Japanese with summaries in English by The Japan Art History Society. The publication is also known as The Journal of the Japan Art History Society.

See also
 Cultural Properties of Japan

References

External links
 Journal Index (English)
 Journal Index (Japanese)

Japanese art
Japanese-language journals
Publications established in 1950
Biannual journals
Art history journals
1950 establishments in Japan